Bruce Ewen Culpan (16 June 1930 – 24 August 2021) was a New Zealand rower who won silver medals representing his country at the 1950 British Empire Games and 1954 British Empire and Commonwealth Games. He worked as a pharmacist for nearly six decades in the Auckland suburb of Remuera.

Early life
Born in the Auckland suburb of Herne Bay on 16 June 1930, Culpan was the son of Hector Cleve Culpan and Olive Maud Culpan (née Cameron). He grew up in the Auckland suburb of Westmere and was educated at Mount Albert Grammar School.

Rowing
At the 1950 British Empire Games, Culpan won the silver medal as part of the men's eight alongside crew members Donald Adam, Kerry Ashby, Murray Ashby, Thomas Engel, Grahame Jarratt, Don Rowlands, Edwin Smith and Bill Tinnock. At the next British Empire and Commonwealth Games in Vancouver, he was the stroke seat of the men's coxed four that won another silver medal.

Professional life
Culpan started a 4-year apprenticeship at Grafton Pharmacy in 1946. He met his wife June while working at that pharmacy; she was a nurse at Auckland Hospital. Once qualified, Culpan became relieving pharmacist for Frank Sanft in Remuera. Sanft died of a heart attack in April 1956 and Sanft's widow asked Culpan to continue the pharmacy, and he eventually bought the business from the estate, and then the building the business was in. He changed its name to Remuera Pharmacy, which caused a stir amongst his peers as all pharmacies were known under the names of their owners, and there were several pharmacies in the suburb. He sold the business in 2003 to one of his former apprentices and retired from the pharmacy in 2005.

Family and death
The Culpans had two daughters and two sons. The family lived in Clonbern Road, which is off Remuera Road and enabled Culpan to walk to work. Culpan died in Cambridge on 24 August 2021, aged 91. His wife had died before him.

References

1930 births
2021 deaths
New Zealand male rowers
Rowers at the 1950 British Empire Games
Rowers at the 1954 British Empire and Commonwealth Games
Commonwealth Games silver medallists for New Zealand
Commonwealth Games medallists in rowing
Rowers from Auckland
People educated at Mount Albert Grammar School
Medallists at the 1950 British Empire Games
Medallists at the 1954 British Empire and Commonwealth Games